Grub am Forst is a municipality in the district of Coburg in Bavaria in Germany. It has ca 3,100 residents. The nearest large town is Coburg. The following villages are part of it: 
Buscheller 
Forsthub 
Rohrbach 
Roth am Forst 
Zeickhorn 
The municipality's political parties are the CSU, SPD, the Freie Wähler and the Wählervereinigung Gut für Grub.

The coat of arms shows a pinophyta in a valley between two hills. It describes the location of Grub am Forst: a village between two hills (Grub/Grube) which is located near to a forest (Forst/Wald).

References

External links
 www.grub-am-forst.de

Coburg (district)